Tyrique Bartlett (born 14 April 1999) is a South African professional footballer who plays as a forward for Cape Town Spurs.

Club career
In June 2017, Bartlett joined Newcastle United on a three-year deal after a successful trial. In June 2019, he was released by Newcastle United. In February 2020, he joined National First Division side Cape Umoya United on a free transfer. On 28 February 2020, he made his professional league debut as a substitute in a 2–0 loss to Marumo Gallants. In December 2021, he joined Cape Town Spurs.

International career
In August 2017, Bartlett was called up to the South Africa U20 squad for the first time.

Personal life
Bartlett was born in Switzerland. He is the son of former South Africa international footballer Shaun Bartlett.

References

External links

1999 births
Living people
South African soccer players
Association football forwards
National First Division players
Newcastle United F.C. players
Cape Umoya United F.C. players
Cape Town Spurs F.C. players
South African expatriate soccer players
South African expatriate sportspeople in England
Expatriate footballers in England